Neodiplogynium vallei is a species of parasitic mite belonging to the family Diplogyniidae. This is an oval species with a length of around  mm. It is an ectoparasite found on brown rats (Rattus norvegicus) in Puerto Rico. It can be distinguished from its congeners by the presence of a sclerotized epigynal plate.

References
 

Mesostigmata
Animals described in 1959
Parasites of rodents
Endemic fauna of Puerto Rico